The Lakes is a British television drama series, created and principally written by Jimmy McGovern, first broadcast on BBC1 on 14 September 1997. The series, which was principally filmed in and around Patterdale and The Ullswater Hotel, Glenridding, stars John Simm as Danny Kavanagh, a hotel porter, compulsive gambler, and philanderer who escapes from the dole queues in Liverpool to live in the Lake District. After he meets and marries local girl Emma Quinlan (Emma Cunniffe), they move back to Liverpool. However, the consequences of Danny's gambling habit results in Emma moving back to the Lakes. Months later, Danny also returns, and takes up a job looking after a rowing boat concession, and starts to patch up his relationship with Emma.

Two series were broadcast. The first, made of four episodes including a feature-length pilot, aired during September and October 1997. A second series, extended to ten episodes, broadcast from January to March 1999. McGovern described the series as "partially autobiographical", having also been a gambling addict and having met his wife Eileen while working at a hotel in Cumbria. McGovern's involvement in the second series was heavily reduced, with a number of co-writers contributing to the series, including Joe Ainsworth, William Gaminara and Julie Rutterford. The series was critically acclaimed when first broadcast, although it caused controversy due to the hard-hitting portrayal of an immoral British sub-culture, and scenes of sex and violence. The series was considered a springboard for many members of the cast, including Kaye Wragg, James Thornton, Kevin Doyle and Elizabeth Berrington.

Merchandise
The complete series was released as a four-disc box set by Second Sight Media on 6 October 2003. The set contains additional commentaries for the first series by John Simm and director David Blair. The box set was re-issued on 16 April 2012, however both the original and re-issue are now out of print. Region 4 DVD released rated the series R16 for offensive language and scenes of a sexual nature.

A novelisation of the first series by Kate Lock (credited as K.M. Lock) was released on 4 September 1997, ten days prior to the broadcast of the first episode. A soundtrack to the series was also issued on CD and Cassette in 1997, containing contributions from the likes of Blur, Cast, Echo and the Bunnymen, the Manic Street Preachers, Supergrass and Radiohead.

Plot

Series 1 (1997)
After leaving the Lakes to move to Liverpool, Emma (Emma Cunniffe) decides to return home after her husband Danny's gambling addiction begins to grow progressively stronger. Months later, Danny follows her and takes up a job looking after a rowing boat concession. Meanwhile, he is forced to reject the unsubtle advances of the attention-seeking Lucy Archer (Kaye Wragg), who unable to take the pain of rejection, becomes determined to take out revenge. When three schoolgirls drown in a boating accident whilst Danny is on duty at work, he is unwilling to tell the truth, having been distracted by betting over the telephone - despite promising Emma that he would stop gambling. As the community looks for someone to blame, Lucy lies to the police to implicate him.

Series 2 (1999)
When Lucy is raped by three locals, only Danny, enduring the claustrophobic hostility of the Quinlan family home, can testify as a witness - which puts him at odds with the village, his wife and her family.

Cast

Main
 John Simm as Danny Kavanagh
 Emma Cunniffe as Emma Kavanagh; Danny's wife, daughter of Bernie and Peter
 Kaye Wragg as Lucy Archer; Cecil and Doreen's daughter
 Mary Jo Randle as Bernie Quinlan; Emma's mother, who is a devout Catholic
 Paul Copley as Peter Quinlan; Emma's father
 Elizabeth Rider as Sheila Thwaite; Bernie's sister
 David Westhead as Arthur Thwaite; Sheila's husband (1.1 – 2.1)
 Robert Pugh as Father Matthew; the local parish priest
 Charles Dale as Gary Alcock; hotel chef and renowned sex addict
 Kevin Doyle as John Parr/Fisher; a school headteacher
 Clare Holman as Simone Parr/Fisher; nymphomaniac wife of John, lover of Chef
 Elizabeth Bennett as Doreen Archer; a local hotel owner
 Nicholas Day as Cecil Archer; Doreen's husband
 Elizabeth Berrington as Ruth Alcock; Gary's wife
 Bob Mason as Sergeant Eddie Slater; a local policeman
 Tony Rohr as Grandad; Bernie Quinlan and Sheila Thwaite's father
 James Thornton as Pete Quinlan; Emma's brother
 Jessica Perry as Annie Quinlan; Bernie and Peter's youngest child
 Barbara Wilshere as Sarah Kilbride; a local GP and closet lesbian
 Matt Bardock as Albie; a chirpy Cockney
 Robin Laing as Joey; a local who always speaks in the third person
 Lee Oakes as Tharmy; a local who has a stutter
 Samantha Seager as Julie

Supporting
 Marshall Lancaster as Ged Hodgson (2.1 – 2.9)
 Annabelle Apsion as Beverly Fisher; Simone's sister (2.2 – 2.10)
 Amanda Mealing as Jo Jo Spiers; schoolteacher (2.1 – 2.8)
 Joel Phillimore as Thomas Alcock; Gary's son (2.1 – 2.7)
 Robert Morgan as Charles Kilbride; Sarah's husband (2.1 – 2.4)
 Ryan Pope as Robert (1.1 – 1.4)
 Justin Brady as Billy Jennings (2.2 – 2.4)
 Debbie Chazen as Delilah; a friend of Emma's (1.1 – 1.4)
 Jenna Scruton as Paula Thwaite; Sheila and Arthur's daughter (1.1 – 1.3)
 Sally Rogers as Juliet Bray; owner of the boatyard (1.1 – 1.4)
 Kate Fitzgerald as 'Mam' Kavanagh; Danny's mother (1.1)
 Arthur Kelly as 'Dad' Kavanagh; Danny's father (1.1)
 Anthony Newley as the Bishop; Bishop of the local parish (2.8)

Episodes

Series 1 (1997)

Series 2 (1999)

References

External links

BBC television dramas
Television shows set in the Lake District
1990s British drama television series
1997 British television series debuts
1999 British television series endings
Television series by All3Media
English-language television shows